Dogstar is an Australian animated television series produced by Media World Pictures  which first screened on the Nine Network and then Disney Channel Australia. There are 26 episodes in each season. 
 
Dogstar was produced by Colin South and Ross Hutchens, written by Doug MacLeod and Philip Dalkin, designed by Scott Vanden Bosch  and directed by Aaron Davies. Editing and special effects were done by Merlin Cornish and the music was composed by Yuri Worontschak.

Series synopsis
After thousands of years of wars, pollution, undrinkable water and silly cartoon shows, humans are forced to leave Earth and move everything and everyone to a new planet: New Earth. But not everything goes to plan when the Dogstar, a giant space ark containing all of the world's dogs, goes off course and becomes lost in space. On New Earth, the evil Bob Santino makes his fortune selling canine replacement units, Robogs, and plots to ensure the Dogstar is never found. But the Clark kids desperately miss their real dog, Hobart, and begin a quest through space to find the Dogstar - with Bob in hot pursuit.

Series 1: 2006
 A Dog's Tale - 4 September 2006
 Obedience School - 18 September 2006
 Fetch - 11 September 2006
 Pedigree - 25 September 2006
 Dogfight - 2 October 2006
 Dog Ears - 9 October 2006
 Underdogs - 16 October 2006
 Sit Drop Stay - 23 October 2006
 The Beagle Has Landed - 30 October 2006
 Sick as a Dog - 6 November 2006
 Puppy Love - 13 November 2006
 Running with the Pack - 20 November 2006
 Paws - 27 November 2006
 Dog Show - 16 April 2007
 Old Dog New Tricks - 23 April 2007
 Hounded - 30 April 2007
 Dog Gone - 7 May 2007
 Bad Dog - 14 May 2007
 Dog Leg - 21 May 2007
 Top Dog - 4 June 2007
 Let Sleeping Dogs Lie - 11 June 2007
 Off Lead Area - 18 June 2007
 Dogged Determination - 25 June 2007
 Man Bites Dog - 2 July 2007
 Smart Dog - 9 July 2007
 A Tail's End - 16 July 2007

Series 2: 2011
 Public Enemy Number One
 The Quick and the Dog
 Fred Ward
 Even Deeper Impact
 Father's Day
 Absent Friends
 Robbie
 The Big Bang
 Little Boy Lost
 Fatal Attraction
 Robot Revolution
 Twice The Excitement
 Dogtopia
 Game Time
 Mensamania
 Rockin' In The Flea World
 The Greatest Superhero
 It's The End of the World As We Know It
 Robosauria
 Secrets And More Secrets
 Persuasion
 The Good, The Bad and the Baba
 Titanium Chef
 Reach Out And Touch Somebody's Paw
 The Greening of Gavin
 Relative Dimensions in Space

Christmas special
Media World Pictures produced a movie length Christmas special called Dogstar – Christmas in Space for the Nine Network, which was released in Christmas 2016.

Cast
The series featured the following voice artists:
Brandon Burns (voice of Glenn Clark)
Kate McLennan (Simone Clark)
Emma Leonard (Lincoln Clark)
 Roslyn Oades (Gemma)
 Beverley Dunn (Gran Clark)
 Henry Maas (Bob Santino)
 Marg Downey (Alice, Daina and Greta)
 Matt Tilley (Zeke)
 Gary Files (Ramon Ridley)
 Michael Veitch (Mark Clark)
 Matthew King (Hank and Planet Man)
 Simone Gescheit (Dino Santino)
 Hamish Hughes (guest roles)
 Shaun Micallef (Boombah and Narrator)
Abbe Holmes (Fenwick and various guest roles)

Awards 
The series has garnered numerous awards:

2009 awards 
 Nominated for a Logie - Most outstanding Children's Program category

2008 awards 
 ASIAN TELEVISION AWARDS - Best Animation
 WRITERS GUILD OF AUSTRALIA - AWGIE for Best Children's Television Script
 WA SCREEN AWARDS, Australia - Outstanding Achievement for Animation Production
 THE HUGO TELEVISION AWARDS, Chicago International Film Festival - Certificate of Merit for Animated Series
 AFI, Australia - Nomination, Best Screenplay, Television
 AFI, Australia - Nomination, Best Guest/Supporting Actor, TV Drama
 ECOVISION FESTIVAL, Italy - Finalist
 ELECTRONIC AND ANIMATED ARTS ELAN AWARDS, Canada - Finalist, Best International Animated Production (Television Series)

2007 awards 
 WRITERS GUILD OF AUSTRALIA - AWGIE Finalist, Best Children's Television Script
 ENHANCE TV ATOM AWARDS, Australia - Finalist, Best Children's Television Series
 APOLLO AWARDS, Asia - Best Animated Opening Sequence
 INTERNATIONAL SHOWCASE, CARTOONS ON THE BAY, Italy Official Selection

2006 awards 
 Writers Guild of Australia - AWGIE for Best Children's Television Script
 Australian Effects and Animation Festival, Australia - Finalist, Best Television Animation

References

External links
 

2006 Australian television series debuts
2007 Australian television series endings
2000s Australian animated television series
Australian children's animated television series
Australian flash animated television series
Nine Network original programming
Animated television series about dogs